Wali-e-Mewat Raja Khanzada  Zakaria Khan Mewati, Bahadur, son of Khanzada Ahmad Khan Mewati,  was the Khanzada Rajput ruler of Mewat from 1468 till 1485. He was succeeded by his son Khanzada Alawal Khan Mewati as Wali-e-Mewat in 1485.

References

 

Mewat
Indian Muslims
Year of birth unknown